COVID-19 vaccination in Thailand is an ongoing mass immunization in response to the ongoing pandemic in the country.

Background 
In November 2020, the authorities ordered 26 million doses of vaccine from AstraZeneca, which reported 70% overall efficacy. It requires 2 doses of vaccine per person, so the quantity ordered would only cover 13 million people. Prayut cabinet later approved budget for ordering 35 million additional doses in January 2021. Siam Bioscience, a company owned by King Vajiralongkorn, will received technological transfer for co-investment. The authorities also imported 2 million doses of vaccine from Sinovac, a Chinese company which Thai conglomerate Charoen Pokphand invested in, during February to April 2021.

Likewise, the Thai government also stepped up its attempt to produce its homegrown vaccines amidst criticism, with "ChulaCov19" and set to begin trials in May 2021. Phase I testing of the NDV-HXP-S vaccine began at Mahidol University in March 2021.

In July 2021, the National Vaccine Institute apologized for slow vaccine deployment. Meanwhile, the government's prior commitment to secure 61 million doses of AstraZeneca vaccine became doubted after a leaked document showed that the company would deliver no more than 60 percent of the number planned per month. A virology advisor also endorsed an untested plan to mix AstraZeneca and Sinovac vaccines. There was already a report of death from the practice, but health professionals said they have to rule out other causes first.

Vaccines used

National Vaccines 
Free Vaccines which are provided under the policies of the Ministry of Public Health.

Optional Vaccines 
Vaccines that are not in the policies of the Ministry of Public Health. Orders are made through government organizations but the cost of vaccination will not be supported by the government. However, people who get vaccinated by these vaccines are still counted in the national vaccination programme.

Vaccines pending approval 
 Sputnik V
 Covaxin

Vaccination Procedures 
Vaccination procedures used in Thailand.

Notes 
MOPH suspended the procedures of the first two doses of Sinovac vaccine on 12 July 2021 due to inefficient immunization against Delta variant. People who received the Sinovac vaccine for the first dose and had an appointment date for second dose after suspension, the second doses will be switched to other vaccines automatically.
MOPH suspended the procedures of the first two doses of AstraZeneca on 11 September 2021 due to long dose interval process which takes time for creating immunization. People who received the first dose of AstraZeneca vaccine before the suspension will continue to receive the same AstraZeneca vaccine for second dose. However, People who haven't received the first dose before the suspension will have to start with other procedures instead.
Excluding the procedure of Jannsen vaccine which is currently imported and managed by the Embassy of France in Thailand under the approval of MOPH, only French nationals living in Thailand are eligible to receive this vaccine for now.

Vaccines in trial stage

Notes

References 

Thailand
vaccination